E. M. Todd Company, also known as Todd's Ham Building, is a historic factory building located in the Three Corners District of Richmond, Virginia.  The original section was built in 1892 and expanded in 1919 and 1920. The expansion included five story smoke houses. It originally housed the Richmond Brewery, and was later acquired by the E. M. Todd Company a manufacturer of smoked ham and bacon. The E. M. Todd Company ceased operations at the plant in 1998.

The building has been converted to loft apartments called the Todd Lofts. It was listed on the National Register of Historic Places in 2002.

See also 
 Richmond Brewery Stores
 List of defunct breweries in the United States

References

Industrial buildings and structures on the National Register of Historic Places in Virginia
Industrial buildings completed in 1892
Buildings and structures in Richmond, Virginia
National Register of Historic Places in Richmond, Virginia
Apartment buildings in Virginia
Defunct brewery companies of the United States
Ham producers
Food manufacturers of the United States